Brandon Bonaparte Brown (born 1981) is an American lawyer who has served as the United States Attorney for the Western District of Louisiana since 2021.

Education 

Brown earned a Bachelor of Arts in 2002 and a Master of Business Administration in 2004 from Louisiana Tech University, followed by a Juris Doctor in 2007 from the Southern University Law Center.

Career 

From 2007 to 2012, Brown served as an assistant prosecuting attorney in the Ouachita Parish District Attorney's Office. He was also an associate at Hammonds, Sills, Adkins & Guice, LLP in Baton Rouge, Louisiana. Since 2012, he has served as an assistant United States attorney in the United States Attorney's Office for the Western District of Louisiana.

U.S. attorney for the Western District of Louisiana  

On November 12, 2021, President Joe Biden announced his intent to nominate Brown to serve as the United States attorney for the Western District of Louisiana. On November 15, 2021, his nomination was sent to the United States Senate. On December 2, 2021, his nomination was reported out of committee by a voice vote. On December 7, 2021, his nomination was confirmed in the United States Senate by voice vote. He was sworn into office on December 10, 2021.

References 

1981 births
Living people
21st-century American lawyers
African-American lawyers
American prosecutors
Assistant United States Attorneys
Louisiana lawyers
Louisiana Tech University alumni
People from Monroe, Louisiana
Southern University Law Center alumni
United States Attorneys for the Western District of Louisiana